In enzymology, a tyrosine 2,3-aminomutase is an enzyme that catalyzes the chemical reaction

L-tyrosine  3-amino-3-(4-hydroxyphenyl)propanoate

Hence, this enzyme has one substrate, L-tyrosine, and one product, 3-amino-3-(4-hydroxyphenyl)propanoate.

This enzyme belongs to the family of isomerases, specifically those intramolecular transferases transferring amino groups.  The systematic name of this enzyme class is L-tyrosine 2,3-aminomutase. This enzyme is also called tyrosine alpha,beta-mutase.  This enzyme participates in tyrosine metabolism.  It employs one cofactor, 5-methylene-3,5-dihydroimidazol-4-one (MIO) which is formed autocatalytic rearrangement of the internal tripeptide Ala-Ser-Gly.

Structural studies

As of late 2007, only one structure has been solved for this class of enzymes, with the PDB accession code .

References

EC 5.4.3
Enzymes of known structure